Mumbai (Bombay) is India's most populous city with a population of 20 Million. It is located on Salsette Island off the coast of Maharashtra. The original Seven Islands of Bombay were merged by the British in the 18th century, to form one large island.

Hills
The original Seven Islands of Mumbai consisted of 22 hills. Most of them were raised to fill in the shallows to connect the islands. The hills still standing today are:

 Malabar Hill — the highest point in the city
 Cumbala Hill
 Antop Hill
 Sewri Hill
 Gilbert Hill
 Worli Hill
 Pali Hill
 Mazgaon Hill
 Sion Hill
 Mahakali Hill
 Golanji Hill
 Pulshachi Dongri
 Salamati Hill
 Kanheri Hill

There are three hill ranges with the city limits. The Ghatkopar Hills are present near the station of Ghatkopar. The hill range runs parallel to the Central Railway track and is inhabited by slums. During the monsoon season, landslides are common. The Trombay Hills occupy a large portion of Trombay on the eastern part of the city.

The Powai Hills are present north of the city. The Borivali National Park occupies most of the region. The Vihar and Tulsi Lakes are present within the hills.

Lakes
There are three lakes in the city. The Vihar Lake and the Tulsi Lake are present within the National Park and supply part of the city's drinking water. The Powai Lake is immediately south of these two. They are located in central Mumbai.

Bays
Back Bay is the largest bay in the city. The coastline of Back Bay is an inverted C-shaped region 4 kilometres in length, and Marine Drive is located along this stretch. North of Marine Drive is Worli Bay. In the centre of the bay is the tomb of Haji Ali, a 14th-century Muslim saint. The bay perimeter is about two kilometres in length.

Mahim Bay is the second largest bay in the city. The Mithi River empties into the Mahim Creek which drains into the bay. The border between the city and its suburbs bisects the bay. To the north lies Bandra and to the south, Mahim.

Creeks
Mumbai has numerous creeks with close to 71 km2 of creeks and mangroves along its coastline. The mangroves adjoin broad tidal mudflats adjacent to the city. The Vasai Creek to the north and Thane Creek to the east separates Salsette Island from the mainland. Within the city the Malad (or Marve) Creek and the Gorai (or Manori) Creek inundate the suburban region. The Mahim Creek forms the border between the two districts. There are also the Mahul Creek and the Mahim Creek.

Islands

Although the islands were merged in the 18th century, islands still dot Thane Creek. Elephanta Island, Butcher Island, Oyster Rock, Cross Island and Middle Ground are scattered across the Creek. The latter three are uninhabited islets owned by the Indian Navy.

Rivers
 Dahisar River
 Poisar River (Poisar-Poinsar River)
 Chandansar River
 Oshiwara River
 Vakola River
 Gadhi River
 Mahul River (Mahabali-Mahul River)
 Mithi River (Mahikavati-Mithi river)

References